Prince Albert Casimir of Saxony, Duke of Teschen (11 July 1738, Moritzburg, Electorate of Saxony – 10 February 1822, Vienna) was a Saxon prince from the House of Wettin who married into the Habsburg imperial family. He was noted as an art collector and founded the Albertina in Vienna, one of the largest and finest collections of old master prints and drawings in the world.

Biography
He was a younger son of King Augustus III of Poland (who was also Elector of Saxony) and Maria Josepha of Austria, a first cousin of Empress Maria Theresa, being the eldest daughter of Emperor Joseph I. Prince Albert of Saxony, Duke of Teschen, was also one of the godparents to his namesake, Prince Albert of Saxe-Coburg and Gotha.

Young Albert was specifically chosen by Archduchess Maria Christina of Austria to be her husband. This was a special favour granted by her mother, Empress Maria Theresa of Austria, because marriages of imperial children were usually used for diplomatic purposes. Still, the betrothal and wedding had to wait until the death of her father, Emperor Francis I, and the wedding decorations were black because it occurred during the official mourning period after his death. From his father-in-law's estate, Albert received the territory of Teschen in Austrian Silesia and was accordingly given the title of Duke of Teschen. Since he became a member of the Habsburg-Lorraine family, the title of Archduke was also given to him.

The Silesian Duchy of Teschen had been inherited by Emperor Francis through his father's Gonzaga ancestry, as compensation for the lost Duchy of Montferrat, taken from them in favor of the dukes of Savoy. Archduchess Maria Christina, the daughter of Francis of Lorraine, received the duchy among her dowry. Prince Albert of Saxony thus became the Duke of Teschen, the only non-Habsburg to become such after the title passed into Habsburg control. Their marriage remained childless except for a daughter that died as a baby, and upon the death of the widowed Albert in 1822, Teschen was granted to their adopted son, Archduke Charles of Austria, who became Duke of Teschen and started the Habsburg-Lorraine branch of Dukes of Teschen.

Albert was royal governor of Hungary from 1765 to 1781, with his seat at Bratislava Castle and his summer residence in Halbturn Castle at Neusiedl. He was then made Governor of the Austrian Netherlands, along with his wife. In Brussels, they built a palace in Laeken (the present-day home of the Belgian royal family) as their seat. There, he assembled the beginnings of his vast art collection, which he took with him when the couple had to flee from Brussels to Vienna in 1793, due to the French Revolution and following his military defeat by invasion forces at the Battle of Jemappes.

In Vienna, a palace adjoining the Hofburg, originally designed by Emanuel Teles Silva-Tarouca, was enlarged for them by architect Louis Montoyer. That palace is today called the Albertina, after Albert, and houses the collection he started. Only two-thirds of his collection survives, because one of the cargo ships bringing it from Brussels sank en route. After his return to Vienna, he used as an advisor Adam von Bartsch, the Curator of the Imperial prints collection and the greatest prints scholar of his age.

After the early death of his wife in 1798 of typhus, he lived only for his art collection, which he bequeathed to his (wife's) nephew and adopted son Archduke Charles of Austria.

Next door to his palace, in the Augustinerkirche, Albert had a famous memorial to his wife carved by Antonio Canova. The couple are buried in tombs 111 and 112 in the Tuscan Vault of the Imperial Crypt in Vienna, with their hearts in urns 40 and 28 in the nearby Herzgruft, and their viscera in urns 75 and 63 of the Ducal Crypt in Vienna's cathedral.

Ancestry

References

External links

 Albertina Museum (in German)

1738 births
1822 deaths
People from Moritzburg
People from the Electorate of Saxony
German Roman Catholics
Saxon princes
Polish Prince Royals
Dukes of Teschen
House of Habsburg-Lorraine
House of Wettin
Governors of the Habsburg Netherlands
German art collectors
18th-century art collectors
19th-century art collectors
Knights of the Golden Fleece of Spain
Burials at the Imperial Crypt
Burials at St. Stephen's Cathedral, Vienna
Albertine branch
Recipients of the Order of the White Eagle (Poland)
Sons of kings